Admiral Buller may refer to:

Alexander Buller (1834–1903), British Royal Navy admiral
Sir Edward Buller, 1st Baronet (1764–1824), British Royal Navy vice admiral
Francis Alexander Waddilove Buller (1879–1943), British Royal Navy rear admiral
Henry Buller (1873–1960), British Royal Navy admiral